Abbas Torabian (عباس ترابیان, born 12 January 1952, Tehran, Iran) is the former team manager of Iran national football team and the current head of futsal committee in Islamic Republic of Iran Football Federation. He was deputy chairman of the Esteghlal FC from 1998 to 2008, and was appointed as head of the futsal committee by Ali Kafashian in November 2008. He became team manager and director of Iran national football team in April 2011 after his successful talks with Carlos Queiroz to become head coach of national team, but resigned in November 2011 to continue his career at futsal committee. He was an employee in the Ministry of Petroleum before starting football careers.

Suspension 
In June 2019, Abbas Torabian and Ali Kafashian were suspended by the Iranian Football Federation's Ethic Committee for financial corruption.

References

1952 births
Living people
Iranian football chairmen and investors